The Israeli Air Force Flight Academy trains aircrew to operate Israeli Air Force aircraft, qualifying fighter, helicopter and transport pilots as well as combat and transport navigators.

The IAF flight course is considered one of the most prestigious courses in the IDF. It lasts for three years and is held largely in the Hatzerim Airbase near Beer Sheva. Graduates of the course receive the rank of lieutenant and a BA from the Ben-Gurion University of the Negev. After their training, the graduates must undertake mandatory military service of seven years. On average, only one out of nine students completes the course successfully.

History 

The first IAF flight course was completed in March 1949 in Hatzor Airbase. The first four graduates, including Mordechai Hod and Danny Shapira, had received their training in Czechoslovakia. In May 1949 12 more graduates completed the second IAF flight course, which also took place mostly in Czechoslovakia. The first flight course held entirely in Israel was held at Camp Sirkin, near Petah Tikva, and began on 14 February 1950. The first base commander was Benjamin Bune (Bunisslvsky), The first chief training officer was Gideon Shohet, The first commander of the primary flight school was Pinchas Ben-Porat and the first commander of the advanced flight school was George Lichter. Most of the flight instructors at the time were foreign and the official language of the course was English. The course ended on 10 August 1950 and had 13 pilot graduates and four navigator graduates. In order to prepare them as fighter pilots, in December 1950 a separate operational training squadron was established, flying the Supermarine Spitfire.

Until 1955 the flight courses took place at the Sirkin Airbase, before moving to the Tel Nof Airbase. In April 1966 the IAF flight course was transferred once more to Hatzerim Airbase. With the increasing need for helicopter pilots, in 1965 a helicopter flight school was established within the IAF flight school. Until then all the helicopter pilots were trained in Europe and the United States.

In 2002 the structure of the flight course changed, it was extended from two years to three years, and included undergraduate academic studies. In addition, since 2002 the flight course graduates receive the rank of lieutenant, and not the rank of Second Lieutenant.

Pilot Selection 
The selection process for IAF pilots can be traced to Ezer Weizman, widely considered the architect of the modern Israeli Air Force, and his aim of recruiting only "the best for pilots." His reasoning was that the skill and bravery of the ground forces would be for naught if they could be attacked at will from the air. As a result, only those thought to possess the innate ability to succeed as Israeli pilots are even invited to begin the training process, and only the most qualified succeed in completing what is seen by many as the world's most demanding military selection course.

Consequently, potential Israeli pilots are identified prior to reporting for national service at age 18, based on factors such as high grades in school and top scores on standardized tests, excellent physical condition and high technical aptitude. Those who meet these and other criteria are invited to participate in a six-day gibush (cohesion), a selection phase involving physical, mental, and sociometric challenges. Recruits are screened not only for their ability to perform the tasks assigned, but for their attitude in performing them —such as how they take hardships and unexpected difficulties, how well they work in groups and how they approach problem solving and disaster management situations. As many as 50% percent of those who commence the gibush will be dropped from further consideration at its conclusion.

Those who pass the gibush embark on a three-year journey to earn their wings, which includes extensive flight training, infantry training, an officer's course, and studies towards an academic degree (a B.A. or BSc). The prospective pilots are evaluated constantly, and the vast majority of those who begin flight training do not make it through the full program. Those expelled from the course will either remain in the air force in a non-flying capacity, or transfer to an army unit. (This depends to a large degree on the stage at which they leave the course.)

While in flying school, future pilots are sorted and assigned to train on different types of aircraft. Relatively few become fighter pilots (considered by many to be the most desirable assignment), while the remainder learn to fly helicopters, transport aircraft, or train as navigators.

After a landmark 1994 High Court appeal by a Jewish immigrant from South Africa, Alice Miller, the Air Force was instructed to open its flight school to women. Miller passed her entrance exams, yet failed the medical tests and thus did not qualify. The first female fighter pilot, Roni Zuckerman, received her wings in 2001, although a female navigator had already graduated in 1998.

While Israeli Arabs may volunteer to serve in the IDF, it is unclear whether they can seek air force training. In 2006, an Israeli Arab applied for the pilot program, but was not accepted. In 2009 the first Israeli Druze finished the course and received his wings. In early 2018, it was announced that a Bedouin candidate had been accepted into the pilot course.

Course phases

Preparation phase 

The first phase of the flight course lasts about six months. It includes an infantry basic training course at the Infantry School of the Air Force (lasting about seven weeks), an academic course (mathematics and physics and a course which focuses on the history of IDF) (lasts about eight weeks) and training flights in a Grob G-120 plane (lasts about four weeks).

During this and most of the following phases of the course the cadets wear a Beret with a white stripe around the edge, and a white background behind the Air Force symbol.

Basics phase 

This phase lasts about five months. It includes a complex infantry series (including navigation, survival, etc.), Parachuting course, escaping workshop, Officers Ordination and Academic Studies (lasts about five weeks). At the end of this phase the cadets receive an air crew pin, which is equivalent to the platoon commander pin which is granted to graduates of officers school.

Immediately after the end of the five months of the basic phase the trainees undergo test flights in the T-6 Texan II which determine their distribution to the various departments: combat pilots, helicopter pilots and navigators. Cadets who are dropped from the course at this phase can request to join the UAV operators course, or choose to serve as non-flying officers in the Israeli Air Force—such as air controllers, base security specialists or intelligence officers.

Primary phase 

At this phase, which lasts about six months, the cadets are divided into departments and acquire basic skills needed to fly aircraft. The departments are: combat pilots, combat navigators, transport pilots and helicopter pilots.

Introductions phase and graduate courses phase 
These are two phases in which the cadets study the majority of the content needed to get the BA. These two phases, which are commonly referred to as the "Year of Education" (שנת ההשכלה), last for about a year. Consecutive academic studies for a BA are done under the auspices of the Ben-Gurion University. The intensive academic year (not equivalent to regular university studies) consists of three semesters, of 13 weeks each. The four graduate courses include: Mathematics and Computer Science; Management of Information Systems; Economics and Management; Politics, Administration and Management. In addition, the cadets study about military topics, aviation topics and take three courses in English.

Advanced phase 
The last phase of the course includes acquisition of advanced aircraft skills and finishing the academic studies. Graduates receive at the end of this phase a lieutenant rank, a BA and an aircraft wings pin.

Course completion 
Three years after beginning the course, and two weeks before its completion, a special committee meets to examine all the cadets and determine which ones will be completing the course. While rare, it is not unknown for some cadets to be dropped from the course even at this late stage. After the special committee completes its deliberations, the cadets who will be graduating begin preparing for the ceremony. There are two graduation ceremonies every year, one for each graduating class. One of the graduates' final tasks is to act as the induction cadre for the next class of cadets arriving to begin their gibush, introducing them to military service via a series of punishing physical and mental challenges.

The graduation ceremony, at which the new pilots and navigators receive their wings insignia, is conducted in the presence of the cadets' families, senior government officials (frequently including the prime minister), as well as top air force and army leaders. At both ceremonies, an impressive air show is presented by Air Force helicopters and planes.

After the course ends, the pilots undergo an operational training course that takes place in an operational squadron and lasts about six months, aimed at preparing the IAF pilots for operational missions. The operational training course is conducted in either the M-346 "Lavi" or the F-16, followed by another six months of advanced operational training courses on the same plane. Operational training courses for helicopter pilots are conducted on the UH-60 Blackhawk, operational training courses for attack helicopter pilots on the AH-1 Cobra, and operational training courses for transport aircraft on the King Air 200.

Notable alumni

References 

Israeli Air Force
Military academies in Israel
Air force academies